Mýrdalsjökull (pronounced , Icelandic for "(the) mire dale glacier" or "(the) mire valley glacier") is an ice cap in the south of Iceland. It is to the north of Vík í Mýrdal and to the east of the smaller ice cap Eyjafjallajökull. Between these two glaciers is Fimmvörðuháls pass.

The icecap of the glacier covers an active volcano called Katla. The last eruption took place in 1918. Scientists are actively monitoring the volcano, particularly after the eruption of nearby Eyjafjallajökull began in April 2010. Since the year 930, 16 eruptions have been documented.

Before the Hringvegur (the main ring road round the island) was built, people feared traversing the plains in front of the volcano because of the frequent jökulhlaups (glacial floods) and the deep rivers to be crossed, although the road is still vulnerable to major events.

Mýrdalsjökull is an exceedingly wet location, with models suggesting it receives more than 10 metres of precipitation annually.

See also
 Geography of Iceland
 Glaciers of Iceland
 Iceland plume
 List of lakes in Iceland
 List of islands of Iceland
 List of volcanoes in Iceland
 List of rivers of Iceland
 Volcanism of Iceland
 Waterfalls of Iceland
 List of glaciers

References

External links

http://www.nimbus.it/glaciorisk/Glacier_view.asp?IdGlacier=3965&Vista=paese&Paese=Iceland&IdTipoRischio= (Details of all known Glacier Runs from Mýrdalsjökull)
http://isafold.de/strutstigur02/img_jokull.htm (Photo of Mýrdalsjökull)
https://web.archive.org/web/20040504154433/http://volcano.und.edu/vwdocs/volc_images/europe_west_asia/eldgja.html  (Volcanism)
 Katla: eruption preparedness for tourists

Bodies of ice of Iceland
Ice caps
Katla (volcano)
Southern Region (Iceland)